The 1974 College Football All-America team is composed of college football players who were selected as All-Americans by various organizations and writers that chose College Football All-America Teams in 1974. The National Collegiate Athletic Association (NCAA) recognizes five selectors as "official" for the 1974 season. They are: (1) the American Football Coaches Association (AFCA); (2) the Associated Press (AP) selected based on the votes of sports writers at AP newspapers; (3) the Football Writers Association of America (FWAA) selected by the nation's football writers; (4) the United Press International (UPI) selected based on the votes of sports writers at UPI newspapers; and (5) the Walter Camp Football Foundation (WC). Other selectors included Football News (FN), the Newspaper Enterprise Association (NEA), The Sporting News (TSN), and Time magazine.

Six players were selected unanimously by all five of the official selectors.  The six unanimous All-Americans included running backs Archie Griffin of Ohio State (the 1974 Heisman Trophy winner), Joe Washington of Oklahoma, and Anthony Davis of USC.  On defense, the unanimous All-Americans were defensive back Dave Brown of Michigan, linebacker Rod Shoate of Oklahoma, and defensive end Randy White of Maryland.

The Ohio State and Oklahoma teams each had eight players who received first-team honors.  The Ohio State honorees were Archie Griffin, tight end Doug France, tackle Kurt Schumacher, center Steve Myers, defensive end Van DeCree, defensive tackle Pete Cusick, defensive back Neal Colzie, and punter Tom Skladany. The Oklahoma honorees were Joe Washington, Rod Shoate, receiver Tinker Owens, guard John Roush, center Kyle Davis, defensive tackle Lee Roy Selmon, middle guard Dewey Selmon, and defensive back Randy Hughes.

Consensus All-Americans
The following chart identifies the NCAA-recognized consensus All-Americans for the year 1974 and displays which first-team designations they received.

Offense

Receivers 

 Peter Demmerle, Notre Dame (AFCA [split end], AP-1, UPI-1, WC, NEA-1)
 Pat McInally, Harvard  (AFCA [flanker], AP-2, FWAA, UPI-2, WC, FN, NEA-2)
 Larry Burton, Purdue (FWAA, NEA-2, TSN, Time)
 Tinker Owens, Oklahoma (NEA-1)
 Emmett Edwards, Kansas (TSN)
 Danny Buggs, West Virginia (Time)
 Barry Burton, Vanderbilt (AP-2 [te], FN)
 Steve Rivera, California (AP-3)

Tight ends 

 Bennie Cunningham, Clemson (AFCA, AP-1, UPI-1)
 Jim O'Bradovich, USC (NEA-1)
 Charles Waddell, North Carolina (TSN)
 Elmore Stephens, Kentucky (Time-t)
 Oscar Roan, Southern Methodist (Time-t)
 Dan Natale, Penn State (UPI-2)
 Doug France, Ohio State (NEA-2, Time [t])
 Dick Pawlewicz, William & Mary (AP-3)

Tackles 

 Kurt Schumacher, Ohio State (AFCA, FWAA, UPI-1, WC, NEA-1, TSN, Time)
 Marvin Crenshaw, Nebraska (AFCA, AP-2, FWAA, UPI-1, FN, NEA-2)
 Dennis Harrah, University of Miami (Fla.) (AP-2, TSN, UPI-2, NEA-1, Time)
 Craig Hertwig, Georgia (AP-1, NEA-2)
 Al Krevis, Boston College (AP-1)
 Bob Simmons, Texas (UPI-2, WC)
 Dennis Lick, Wisconsin (FN)
 Mike Biehle, Miami (OH) (AP-3)
 Steve Sylvester, Notre Dame (AP-3)

Guards 

 Ken Huff, North Carolina (AFCA, AP-1, UPI-2, WC, NEA-1, Time, TSN)
 Gerry DiNardo, Notre Dame (AFCA, UPI-1, FN)
 John Roush, Oklahoma (AP-2, FWAA, UPI-1, FN)
 Bill Bain, USC (TSN, Time)
 Burton Lawless, Florida (NEA-1)
 John Nessel, Penn State (WC)
 Andy Dearman, VMI (AP-2)
 Revie Sorey, Illinois (NEA-2)
 Carl Dean, New Mexico State (AP-3)
 Steve Ostermann, Washington State (AP-3, UP-2)

Centers 

 Steve Myers, Ohio State (AP-1 [g], UPI-1, FN, NEA-2 [g])
 Rik Bonness, Nebraska (AP-1)
 Geoff Reece, Washington State (WC, NEA-2, Time)
 Sylvester Croom, Alabama (AFCA, UPI-2)
 Aubrey Schulz, Baylor (AP-2, FWAA)
 Rick Nuzum, Kentucky (NEA-1)
 Kyle Davis, Oklahoma (TSN)
 Jack Balorunos, Penn State (AP-3)

Quarterbacks 

 Steve Bartkowski, California (AP-1, UPI-1, NEA-1, Time-t)
 David Humm, Nebraska (AFCA, AP-2, TSN, Time-t, FN)
 Tom Clements Notre Dame (FWWA)
 Steve Joachim, Temple (AP-3, UPI-2, WC)
 Freddie Solomon, Tampa (NEA-2)

Running backs 

 Archie Griffin, Ohio State (AFCA, AP-1, FWAA, UPI-1, WC, FN, NEA-1, TSN)
 Joe Washington, Oklahoma (AFCA, AP-1, FWAA, UPI-1, WC, FN, NEA-1, TSN)
 Anthony Davis, USC (AFCA, AP-1, FWAA, UPI-1, WC, FN, NEA-2, Time)
 Walter Payton, Jackson State (Time)
 Don Hardeman, Texas A&M (Time)
 Stan Fritts, NC State (AP-2)
 Willard Harrell, Pacific (AP-2)
 Billy Marek, Wisconsin (AP-2, UPI-2)
 Tony Dorsett, Pittsburgh (AP-3, UPI-2, NEA-2)
 Louie Giammona, Utah State (AP-3, UPI-2)
 Walt Snickenberger, Princeton (AP-3)

Defense

Defensive ends 

 Randy White, Maryland (AFCA [DT], AP-1, FWAA, UPI-1 [DT], WC, FN [DT], NEA-1, TSN, Time)
 Pat Donovan, Stanford (AFCA, FWAA, UPI-1)
 Jimmy Webb, Mississippi State (AFCA, AP-3 [DT], WC, NEA-2 [DT])
 Leroy Cook, Alabama (AP-1, FWAA, UP-2)
 Mack Mitchell, Houston (AP-2, WC, NEA-1, TSN, Time)
 Van DeCree, Ohio State (UPI-1, FN)
 Steve Niehaus, Notre Dame (FN)
 Bob Martin, Nebraska (AP-2)
 Ecomet Burley, Texas Tech (NEA-2)
 Fred Dean, Louisiana Tech (NEA-2)
 Jimbo Elrod, Oklahoma (AP-3)
 Greg Murphy, Penn State (AP-3, UP-2)

Defensive tackles 

 Mike Hartenstine, Penn State (AFCA, AP-1, FWAA, UPI-1)
 Louie Kelcher SMU (AP-1 [mg], FWAA, FN, NEA-2 [mg])
 Mike Fanning, Notre Dame (AP-2, WC, NEA-1, TSN, Time)
 Doug English, Texas (AP-1, Time)
 Lee Roy Selmon, Oklahoma (AP-2, UP-2, NEA-1)
 Pete Cusick, Ohio State (AP-3, TSN, UP-2)
 Wayne Baker, BYU (NEA-2)

Middle guards 

 Rubin Carter, Miami (Fla.) (AFCA, AP-3, UPI-1)
 Gary Johnson, Grambling (NEA-1, Time [DT])
 Gary Burley, Pittsburgh  (UP-2, WC)
 Dewey Selmon, Oklahoma (FN)

Linebackers 

 Rod Shoate, Oklahoma (AFCA, AP-1, FWAA, UPI-1, WC, FN, NEA-1, TSN, Time)
 Richard Wood, USC (AP-1, UPI-1, FN, NEA-1)
 Ken Bernich, Auburn (AFCA, AP-1, WC)
 Woodrow Lowe, Alabama (UPI-1, WC, FN)
 Bob Breunig, Arizona State (AFCA, AP-2, UP-2, TSN, Time)
 Ralph Ortega, Florida (TSN, Time)
 Greg Collins, Notre Dame (AP-2, FWAA)
 Brad Cousino, Miami (Ohio) (AP-2 [MG], FWAA)
 Robert Brazile, Jackson State (Time)
 Ed Simonini, Texas A&M (AP-2, UP-2)
 Steve Strinko, Michigan (UP-2)
 Derrel Luce, Baylor (NEA-2)
 Glenn Cameron, Florida (AP-3)
 Al Humphrey, Tulsa (AP-3)
 Danny Kepley, East Carolina (AP-3, NEA-2)

Defensive backs 

 Dave Brown, Michigan (AFCA, AP-1, FWAA, UPI-1, WC, FN, NEA-1 [s], TSN, Time [s])
 Pat Thomas, Texas A&M (AP-1, FWAA, NEA-1 [cb])
 John Provost, Holy Cross (AP-1, UP-2, WC)
 Neal Colzie, Ohio State (AP-2, UPI-1, NEA-1 [cb], TSN, Time [cb])
 Mike Williams, LSU (AFCA, TSN, Time [cb])
 Mike Washington, Alabama (NEA-1 [s], FN, UP-2, Time [cb])
 Robert Giblin, Houston (AFCA, TSN, Time [s])
 Charles Phillips, Southern California (FWAA)
 Randy Hughes, Oklahoma (AP-2, UPI-1, NEA-2 [s])
 Randy Rhino, Georgia Tech (AP-2, WC)
 Mike Fuller, Auburn (FN, NEA-2 [s])
 Tim Gray, Texas A&M (NEA-2)
 Marvin Cobb, USC (AP-3)
 Barry Hill, Iowa State (AP-3, UPI-2)
 Louie Wright, San Jose State (AP-3, NEA-2)

Special teams

Kickers 

 Steve Mike-Meyer, Maryland (TSN, Time)
 Dave Lawson, Air Force (FWAA)

Punters 

 Tom Skladany, Ohio State (FWAA)
 Skip Boyd, Washington (TSN)
 Jeff West, Cincinnati (Time)

Key 
 Bold – Consensus All-American
 -1 – First-team selection
 -2 – Second-team selection
 -3 – Third-team selection

Official selectors

 AFCA – American Football Coaches Association
 AP – Associated Press
 FWAA – Football Writers Association of America
 UPI – United Press International
 WC – Walter Camp Football Foundation

Other selectors

 FN – Football News
 NEA – Newspaper Enterprise Association
 TSN – The Sporting News
 Time – Time magazine

See also
 1974 All-Atlantic Coast Conference football team
 1974 All-Big Eight Conference football team
 1974 All-Big Ten Conference football team
 1974 All-Pacific-8 Conference football team
 1974 All-SEC football team

References 

All-America Team
College Football All-America Teams